The 1956 Denver Pioneers football team represented the University of Denver as a member of the Skyline Conference during the 1956 NCAA University Division football season. In their second season under head coach John Roning, the Pioneers compiled a 6–4 record (4–3 against conference opponents), tied for third in the Skyline, and outscored opponents by a total of 250 to 206.

Schedule

References

Denver
Denver Pioneers football seasons
Denver Pioneers football